Steven Michael Green (born October 4, 1953) is a retired American professional basketball player. He was a 6'7" (2.00 m) and 220 lb (100 kg) small forward and played collegiately at Indiana University where he was first-year head coach Bob Knight's first recruit in 1971. He attended Silver Creek High School in Sellersburg, Indiana.

Professional career
Green was selected by both the Utah Stars in the 1975 American Basketball Association Draft and by the Chicago Bulls with the 12th pick of the second round in the 1975 NBA Draft. In 1975–76 he played with the Utah Stars and Spirits of St. Louis, with combined averages of 9.1 points, 3.7 rebounds and 1.2 assists per game. His NBA career consisted of three seasons with the Indiana Pacers from 1976 to 1979. He holds combined ABA/NBA career averages of 4.6 points and 2.0 rebounds per game. After his NBA career he played for one season in Italy.

Personal life
He entered at the Indiana University School of Dentistry in 1980 and has been practicing dentistry since 1984. His practice is currently located in Fishers, Indiana.

References

External links
NBA stats @ basketball-reference.com
STEVE GREEN – Bob Knight's First IU Recruit
Team Green Dentistry

1953 births
Living people
All-American college men's basketball players
American dentists
American expatriate basketball people in Italy
American men's basketball players
Basketball players from Indiana
Chicago Bulls draft picks
Indiana Hoosiers men's basketball players
Indiana Pacers players
People from Fishers, Indiana
People from Madison, Indiana
People from Sellersburg, Indiana
Small forwards
Spirits of St. Louis players
Utah Stars players